Yetta Zwerling Silverman (December 25, 1894 – January 17, 1982) was a Yiddish movie star during the 1930s and 1940s.

Early life
Yetta Zwerling was born in Kalievo, near Lemberg, Galicia, Austria-Hungary (present-day Choliv, near Lviv, Ukraine). Her father had a fruit business and was also a klezmer. Her sisters Bessie and Mamie sang in the Yiddish theater chorus and brought Yetta in as well.

She emigrated to the United States with her family, finishing high school there and playing juvenile roles in variety theaters and English-language vaudeville.  During her vaudeville years she also sang Yiddish songs like Vu Bistu, Yukel? and Bei Mir Bist du Schoen.

Career

Her first "legitimate role" in Yiddish theatre was as Hanele in Zolotarevsky's Yeshiva Bokher (Schoolboy). She toured and ended up in New York, playing Yiddish vaudeville with Sam Klinetsky at the Grand Theater, then doing four years of English-language comedy with Leon Errol and then six seasons in Philadelphia with Anshel Schorr, who improved her Yiddish and gave her the opportunity to play the soubrette opposite, among others, Celia Adler, Samuel Goldenberg, and Boris Thomashevsky. She then played at the National Theater in Student Prince and with Bertha Kalich in Di neshomeh fun a froy (The Soul of a Woman).

She played alongside Yitskhok Feld, Julius Nathanson, Eli Mintz, Isidore Meltzer, Adof Fenigshtayn, Irving Jacobson, later Menasha Skulnik and Leo Fuchs in Yiddish movies such as Motl der opereytor and Ikh vil zayn a mame. Beyond her comic roles, she sang as a soloist and in duets with her partners. She was also noted for her eccentric outfits and jewels.

Death
In 1982, Yetta Silverman died at Cedar-Sinai Hospital in Los Angeles, California. She was survived by her two sons, Sidney and Arthur Silverman. She was interred at Mount Sinai Memorial Park in Los Angeles.

References

Sources
 

1894 births
1982 deaths
American film actresses
Austro-Hungarian emigrants to the United States
Yiddish theatre performers
Vaudeville performers
Jewish American actresses
Jews from Galicia (Eastern Europe)
American people of Polish-Jewish descent
American people of Austrian-Jewish descent
20th-century American actresses
20th-century American Jews
Burials at Mount Sinai Memorial Park Cemetery